James Rooke (1770–1819) was a British career soldier in the Napoleonic wars. He became commander under Simon Bolivar of the British Legions during the South American wars of independence.

James Rooke was born in Dublin around 1770, the son of General James Rooke.  He joined the British Army in 1791 and fought in various campaigns against the French, reaching the rank of major by 1802. Rooke was well-connected, and became a close friend of the Prince of Wales. However, in 1801 he had to sell most of his property to pay his debts, and moved to France, which was then at peace with Britain, but when war broke out again, the French authorities interned him. He remained in prison until his escape at the start of 1813, when he joined Wellington's army in Spain.  Rooke was discharged from the army when hostilities ended in 1814, but on Napoleon's return in 1815, he rejoined and fought at the Battle of Waterloo.

Rooke left the British army in 1816 and made a trip to St. Kitts in the Caribbean to visit his sister Eleanor, who was wife of Thomas Probyn, the Governor of the colony. In September 1817, Rooke sailed to Angostura (now Ciudad Bolívar) in Venezuela and enrolled in Bolivar's Patriot army as a lieutenant colonel.  He organized and was given command of an Anglo-Venezuelan unit, the 1st Regiment of Hussars of Venezuela.

With this unit, he fought in various battles in the inconclusive Venezuelan campaign of 1818, and received two wounds. In March 1819, Bolivar combined most of his foreign volunteers into a brigade of 250 men named the British Legion, with Rooke as commander. In a bold attempt to break the stalemate with the Spanish forces, Bolivar decided to move west, ascend the Andes and seize the high ground. The journey in the height of the rainy season was gruelling and the force lost 300 men en route, of whom 60 were from the British Legion.

After a pause for recovery, Bolivar led his forces in the Battle of Vargas Swamp, in Boyacá, Colombia, where the British Legion under Rooke fought with distinction, storming uphill against the Spanish defences. During this action Rooke was seriously wounded which led to the amputation of his left arm.

Quotation 

Once Rooke lost his left arm, he raised it with his right arm and shouted in poorly accented Spanish:
"Viva la Patria!" (Long live the homeland.)
The surgeon asked him in English:
"Which Country? Ireland or England?"
Rooke shook his head and replied: 
"The country which will bury me..."

Shortly after, Rooke died on 28 July 1819 at a monastery in Belén de Chámeza, near Tunja.

Rooke is remembered proudly and Colombia honors him for being one of the architects of South American nations independence. His widow, Mrs. Anna Rooke, drew a pension for life and was given honors of a Military Widow.

There is a bronze statue of Colonel Rooke in the nearby town of Paipa where the main square is named after him. There is also a unit of the Colombian army, the 18th Infantry Battalion, named after him.

References

1770 births
1819 deaths
People of the Venezuelan War of Independence
People of the Colombian War of Independence
British Army officers
Military personnel from Dublin (city)
British Army personnel of the Napoleonic Wars